Rao Bika Rathore (5 August 1438 – 17 June 1504), was the founder of the Kingdom of Bikaner in present-day Rajasthan. He was a scion of the Rathore clan of Rajputs. He was a son of Rao Jodha, founder of the kingdom of Marwar.

Establishment of Bikaner 
In 1465 AD, Rao Bika (one of the sons of Rao Jodha and a potential heir to the throne of Marwar) on the occasion in question had come late and taken seat beside his uncle, Rawat Kandhal, with whom he carried a conversation in whisper. The Rao jestingly remarked that they must be making a plan of conquest of new territory, an idea constantly being suggested to him to provide for his large family. Rao Bika and Rawat Kandhal took the observation as a challenge and pledged to win new lands. The land approved by Rao Jodha to conquer through conquest was Jangladesh which had been largely weakened by war as suggested by a Napo, a Sankhala Rajput. On 30 September, 1465 AD, the 27 year old Rao Bika along with Rawat Kandhal who had sworn to establish his nephew just like he did Rao Jodha in Marwar. With a considerable following of 100 horsemen and 500 foot-soldiers left Jodhpur along with his uncles Kandhal, Rupo, Mandan, Mandalo and Nathu; his brothers Bida, Jogayat and others.

They travelled to a place known as Deshnok seeking blessings from the sage Karni Mata. Bika and Kandhal sought guidance. They trained their armies without attracting attention for 3 years at Chundasar. Rao Bika then came again and impressed by his will, Karni Mata guided him and he followed. During his travels Bika stopped at Deshnoke where he consulted the mystic Karni Mata. She gave him her blessings and prophesied that he would be successful. Encouraged by her support, Bika took advantage of the internal rivalries of the Jat clans to carve out his own territory in the "Jangladesh" region of Rajasthan and by 1485 build a small fort called Rati Ghati at the site of the city which today bears his name. In 1488 he began the building of the city itself. In the beginning the neighboring Bhati chiefs were suspicious of the new growing power in their vicinity. Karni Mata, who had become the kuldevi of Rao Bika, brought the rivalry between the Rathores and Bhatis to an end by inspiring Rao Shekha, the powerful Bhati chief of Pugal, to marry his daughter with Rao Bika.

In 1488 itself, Bikaner was named and inaugurated by Karni Mata. As described by Colonel Powett, a British Officer, in his Gazetteer of the Bikaner state (1864)- "To the North and West the Bhatis ruled, and to the East, North East and South East were the settlements of independent Jats; beyond the Jats around Bhatner were Bhatis, Chayals and Johyas, chiefly, if not entirely Muhammadans. Hisar was occupied by the Delhi emperor's subedar. The Kaim Khanis held what is now Shekhawati. The Bidawat country was in the possession of Mohil Rajputs, and the tract which is in the East where Reni is situated was occupied by Chayal and Khinchi Rajputs. It was due to Rawat Kandhal, along with his nephews Rao Bika and Rao Bida that all the above mentioned territories were conquored and incorporated in the Kingdom of Bikaner.

Attack on Mehrangarh and family heirlooms 
Rao Jodha supported Bika in his endeavours in return for which he made a promise to Rao Jodha never try to take the throne of Marwar.
Some valuable family heirlooms which would legitimize his right to found a kingdom were promised to Bika. But Upon Rao Jodha's death in 1488 Rao Bika attempted to claim the heirlooms promised to him, only for his brother, Rao Suja to refuse his request. An army of estimated 80,000 men stormed the Mehrangarh Fort. For 6 hours Bika plundered Mehrangarh fort but left his brothers unharmed and departed with only the promised heirlooms (among which were a sandalwood ’Pugal’ throne brought from Kannauj (still on display in the Junagarh fort, Bikaner), a royal umbrella, a sword and a horse of "divine origin").

Legacy 
Rao Bika had established a separate Kingdom of his along with his followers through conquest. Rao Bika died in 1504. His descendants ruled Bikaner till the Independence of India. During the time of the British raj, Bikaner had become the 6th largest princely state of India.

Notes

Further reading

People from Bikaner
Maharajas of Bikaner
15th-century Indian people
1504 deaths
Year of birth unknown
Indian city founders
1438 births